This is a list of Maltese football transfers for the 2015–16 summer transfer window by club. Only transfers of clubs in the Maltese Premier League and Maltese First Division are included.

The summer transfer window opened on 1 July 2015, although a few transfers may take place prior to that date. The window closes at midnight on 31 August 2015. Players without a club may join one at any time, either during or in between transfer windows.

Maltese Premier League

Balzan
Manager:  Oliver Spiteri

In:

 

Out:

Birkirkara
Manager:  Giovanni Tedesco

In:

 
 

Out:

Floriana
Manager:  Luís Oliveira 

In:

 
 

Out:

Hibernians
Manager:  Branko Nisevic

In:

Out:

Mosta
Manager:  Ivan Zammit

In:

Out:

Naxxar Lions
Manager:  Stefano Grima

In:

Out:

Pembroke Athleta
Manager:  Ricky Pace

In:

Out:

Qormi
Manager:  Jesmond Zerafa

In:

Out:

Sliema Wanderers
Manager:  Stephen Azzopardi

In:

 

Out:

St. Andrews
Manager:  Wayne Attard

In:

Out:

Tarxien Rainbows
Manager:  Jacques Scerri

In:

Out:

Valletta
Manager:  Paul Zammit

In:

Out:

Maltese First Division

Fgura United
Manager:  Ramon Zammit

In:

Out:

Gudja United
Manager:  Leslie Burke

In:

Out:

Gżira United
Manager:  Darren Abdilla

In:

Out:

Ħamrun Spartans
Manager:  Steve D'Amato

In:

Out:

Lija Athletic
Manager:  Brian Spiteri

In:

Out:

Melita
Manager:  Neil Zarb Cousin

In:

Out:

Mqabba
Manager:  Guillermo Ganet

In:

Out:

Pietà Hotspurs
Manager:  Patrick Curmi 

In:

Out:

Rabat Ajax
Manager:  Joey Falzon

In:

Out:

San Ġwann
Manager:  Edmond Lufti

In:

Out:

Senglea Athletic
Manager:  Dennis Fenech

In:

Out:

St. George's
Manager:  Robert Kelly

In:

Out:

Vittoriosa Stars
Manager:  Arturo Di Napoli

In:

Out:

Zebbug Rangers
Manager:  Alfred Attard

In:

Out:

References

External links
 Official Website

Maltese
Transfers
Transfers
2015